The Philipsburg Historic District is a  historic district in Philipsburg, Montana that was listed on the U.S. National Register of Historic Places in 1986.  It includes work by architects Link & Haire and by other architects, among its 154 contributing buildings.  It includes the separately NRHP-listed Granite County Jail.

The district includes "the major commercial, residential, governmental and religious structures" in the town.

References 

Victorian architecture in Montana
Neoclassical architecture in Montana
Geography of Granite County, Montana
Historic districts on the National Register of Historic Places in Montana
National Register of Historic Places in Granite County, Montana